Robert Jocelyn may refer to:

 Sir Robert Jocelyn (died June 1712), 1st baronet, of Hyde Hall Hertfordshire.
 Sir Robert Jocelyn (died November 1741), 3rd baronet, of Hyde Hall Hertfordshire.
 Robert Jocelyn, 1st Viscount Jocelyn (1688–1756), 1st Lord Newport (I), lord chancellor of Ireland
 Robert Jocelyn, 1st Earl of Roden (1731–1791), 2nd Viscount Jocelyn, 2nd Lord Newport and 5th baronet, Irish politician.
 Robert Jocelyn, 2nd Earl of Roden (1756–1820), Irish politician
 Robert Jocelyn, 3rd Earl of Roden (1788–1870), 4th Viscount Jocelyn, 4th Lord Newport, 1st Lord Clanbrassil (UK) and 7th baronet, Irish politician
 Robert Jocelyn, Viscount Jocelyn (1816–1854), British politician and soldier who died before his father
 Robert Jocelyn, 4th Earl of Roden (1846–1880), British politician